Associação Desportiva Vitória, commonly known as Vitória, is a Brazilian football club based in Vitória de Santo Antão, Pernambuco state. They competed in the Série C five times.

History
The club was founded on August 3, 1990. It competed in the Série C in 1992, when it was eliminated in the first stage of the competition, in 1993, in 1994, when it was eliminated in the third stage of the competition, in 1995, when it was eliminated in the second stage of the competition, and in 1995, when it was eliminated in the first stage of the competition. Vitória won the Copa Pernambuco in 1995 and in 2004.

Achievements
 Copa Pernambuco:
 Winners (2): 1995, 2004

Stadium
Associação Desportiva Vitória plays its home games at Estádio Municipal Severino Cândido Carneiro, nicknamed Carneirão. The stadium has a maximum capacity of 3,500 people.

References

Football clubs in Pernambuco
Association football clubs established in 1990
1990 establishments in Brazil